The seventh season of Adventure Time, an American animated television series created by Pendleton Ward, premiered on Cartoon Network on November 2, 2015, and concluded on March 19, 2016, and was produced by Frederator Studios and Cartoon Network Studios. It follows the adventures of Finn, a human boy, and his best friend and adoptive brother Jake, a dog with magical powers to change shape and size at will. Finn and Jake live in the post-apocalyptic Land of Ooo, where they interact with the show's other main characters: Princess Bubblegum, The Ice King, Marceline the Vampire Queen, Lumpy Space Princess, BMO, and Flame Princess.

The season was storyboarded and written by Tom Herpich, Steve Wolfhard, Seo Kim, Somvilay Xayaphone, Jesse Moynihan, Adam Muto, Ako Castuera, Sam Alden, Kirsten Lepore, Andres Salaff, Hanna K. Nyström, Luke Pearson, Lyle Partridge, Kris Mukai, Graham Falk, and Kent Osborne. The seventh season of Adventure Time features an eight-episode story-arc, promoted and originally broadcast as the miniseries Stakes, which examines Marceline's backstory and follows Finn, Jake, Bubblegum, and Marceline as they attempt to defeat several newly resurrected vampires. This season also features the stop-motion episode "Bad Jubies", directed by guest animator Kirsten Lepore.

The season premiered with the episode "Bonnie & Neddy", which was viewed by 1.07 million viewers (this marked a decrease in ratings from the previous season finale, "Hot Diggity Doom"/"The Comet"). The Stakes miniseries, which aired near the beginning of the season, rated well, with each episode being seen by around 1.8 million viewers. The season concluded with "The Thin Yellow Line", which was watched by 1.15 million viewers; this made it the lowest-rated Adventure Time season finale at the time. Critical reception to the season was largely positive, and the episode "The Hall of Egress" was nominated for a Primetime Emmy Award for Short-format Animation at the 68th Primetime Emmy Awards. At the same event, Herpich and Jason Kolowski each won an Emmy Award for Outstanding Individual Achievement in Animation, for their work on "Stakes Part 8: The Dark Cloud" and "Bad Jubies", respectively. "Bad Jubies" won an Annie Award for Best Animated Television/Broadcast Production for Children. Several compilation DVDs that contain episodes from the season have been released, and the full season was released on DVD on July 18, 2017.

Development

Concept
The series follows the adventures of Finn the Human, a human boy, and his best friend Jake, a dog with magical powers to change shape and size at will. Finn and Jake live in the post-apocalyptic Land of Ooo, wherein they interact with the other major characters, including: Princess Bubblegum, The Ice King, Marceline the Vampire Queen, Lumpy Space Princess, BMO, and Flame Princess. Common storylines revolve around Finn and Jake discovering strange creatures, dealing with the antagonistic but misunderstood Ice King, and battling monsters in order to help others. Multi-episode story arcs for this season include Bubblegum adjusting to life in exile and eventually reclaiming the Candy Kingdom crown, and Marceline coming to terms with her vampiric nature.

Production

On July 25, 2014, the series was renewed for a seventh season. On September 26, 2014, Tom Herpich posted a picture on Tumblr of himself and Steve Wolfhard pitching the season premiere to the Adventure Time crew, suggesting that storyboarding for the season had already commenced. By August 9, 2015, production of the season had been completed and most of the staff's focus had shifted to the eighth season. In regards to the tone of the season, at the 2015 New York Comic Con, Muto said that this season focuses more on telling "simpler stories with the characters". While he contrasted the show's seventh season with its sixthwhich he described as "heady"Muto asserted that the seventh season would not be a "throwback" to the show's earlier seasons, which had been defined by their focus on comedy.

Originally, the show's seventh season comprised episodes "Bonnie & Neddy" through "Reboot", for a total of 39. However, when it came time to upload the seventh season onto streaming sites, Cartoon Network chose to end the season with its 26th episode, "The Thin Yellow Line." The network then began counting the remaining 13 episodes (which included "Broke His Crown" through "Reboot") as making up the first portion of season eight, despite their having been produced as part of the seventh. This new episode count was cemented by the release of the complete seventh season DVD on July 18, 2017, which included episodes up until "The Thin Yellow Line".

This season's episodes were produced in a process similar to those of the previous seasons. Each episode was outlined in two-to-three pages that contained the necessary plot information. These outlines were then handed to storyboard artists, who created full storyboards. Design and coloring were done at Cartoon Network Studios in Burbank, California, and animation was handled overseas in South Korea by Rough Draft Korea and Saerom Animation. Kirsten Lepore directed the episode "Bad Jubies", which was animated via stop motion, continuing a tradition from the previous two seasons of using a guest animator for an episode. Lepore had previously animated the short stop-motion tag for Frederator Studios, one of the series' production companies. There was a sneak peek of "Bad Jubies" at the Annecy International Animated Film Festival on June 19, 2015, several months before the season's premiere.

Storyboard artists for the season included Herpich, Wolfhard, Seo Kim, Somvilay Xayaphone, Jesse Moynihan, Muto, Ako Castuera, Sam Alden, Andres Salaff, Hanna K. Nyström, Luke Pearson, Lyle Partridge, Kris Mukai, Graham Falk, and Kent Osborne. Pearson—a British cartoonist who had worked on the fifth season with Xayaphone—was temporarily hired to storyboard two episodes with Partridge. Similarly, Castuera, who had stepped down from her role as a regular storyboard artist after the fifth season, returned in a temporary role for three episodes with Moynihan.

While series creator  Pendleton Ward worked on a few outlines for this season, Osborne told IndieWire that Ward did not take an active role in developing stories that were produced after November 2014. Ward had an oversight role and provided occasional input, focusing much of his attention on developing an Adventure Time movie. In February 2015, Ashly Burch was hired to write story outlines for the show. Burch had voiced several characters in the sixth season before becoming a permanent member of the writing staff. She later joked that, because she was a fan of the show prior to being hired, writing for the show was akin to writing fan fiction.

Miniseries

On February 18, 2015, during Cartoon Network's upfront announcing shows for their 2015–16 season, the network announced a special miniseries, which would air as part of season seven.
Cartoon Network was encouraged to greenlight the miniseries after the success of the 2014 event series Over the Garden Wall, which was created by Pat McHale, the former creative director of Adventure Time. The eight-episode miniseries, entitled Stakes, follows Finn and Jake as they face a new threat brought about when one of Princess Bubblegum's science projects unleashes the ghosts of Marceline's past. Former storyboard artist Rebecca Sugar returned to write a new song for the miniseries (entitled "Everything Stays") and to voice Marceline's mother.

Cast

The voice actors for the season included: Jeremy Shada (Finn the Human), John DiMaggio (Jake the Dog), Tom Kenny (The Ice King), Hynden Walch (Princess Bubblegum), and Olivia Olson (Marceline the Vampire Queen). Ward provided the voice for several minor characters, including Lumpy Space Princess. Former storyboard artist Niki Yang voices the sentient video game console BMO in English, as well as Jake's girlfriend Lady Rainicorn in Korean. Polly Lou Livingston, a friend of Pendleton Ward's mother, Bettie Ward, voices the small elephant, Tree Trunks. Jessica DiCicco voices Flame Princess, Finn's ex-girlfriend and the sovereign of the Fire Kingdom. Andy Milonakis voices N.E.P.T.R., a sentient robot who makes and throws pies. Several episodes also feature The Lich, the series' principal antagonist. The Lich's demonic form is voiced by Ron Perlman. The Adventure Time cast recorded their lines together to capture more natural-sounding dialogue among the characters. Hynden Walch has described these group sessions as akin to "doing a play reading—a really, really out there play."

Guest voices were provided by actors, musicians, artists, and others. Andy Daly returned as the King of Ooo and Paul Scheer as Toronto in the season premiere "Bonnie and Neddy". Daly would go on to be featured in other season seven episodes as well, like "Varmints", "Mama Said", "May I Come In?", "Take Her Back", and "The Dark Cloud". "Bonnie & Neddy" also features supervising director Andres Salaff voicing Neddy. Anne Heche returned to voice the titular character in "Cherry Cream Soda", and storyline writer Jack Pendarvis reprised his role as Root Beer Guy. Pendarvis returned in the episode "Mama Said", with storyboard artist Ako Castuera as the voice of Canyon. The miniseries features Sugar as Marceline's mother, Ava Acres as a young Marceline, Rebecca Romijn as The Empress, Billy Brown as the Vampire King, Paul Williams as the Hierophant, Ron Funches as the Fool, Beau Billingslea as the Moon, and Kyle Kinane as Cloud Dance. "The More You Moe, the Moe You Know" features Chuck McCann reprising his role as Moe, and guest stars Thu Tran as AMO. Paget Brewster and Ron Lynch return in "Summer Showers" and voice Viola and Mr. Pig, respectively. In "Angel Face", Kyla Rae Kowalewski reprises her role as Me-Mow. "Weird Al" Yankovic returns as Banana Man in "President Porpoise is Missing", with James Urbaniak as Vice President Blowfish. Kevin Michael Richardson appears in "Bad Jubies", lending his voice to an automated storm alert and an aggressive storm. In "King's Ransom", storyboard artist Tom Herpich reprises the role of Mr. Fox. Max Charles appears in "Scamps", voicing Hugo the chocolate-dipped marshmallow. "Crossover" features Kumail Nanjiani and James Kyson reprising their roles of Prismo and Big Destiny, respectively; Lou Ferrigno appears in the same episode, playing Bobby, an alternate universe variant of the hero Billy. In "Flute Spell", Jenny Slate voices Huntress Wizard and Steve Agee voices Science Cat. Tunde Adebimpe, the lead singer from the band TV on the Radio, appears in "The Thin Yellow Line", voicing Banana Guard 16.

Various other characters are voiced by Tom Kenny, Dee Bradley Baker, Maria Bamford, Steve Little, Kent Osborne, and Melissa Villaseñor.

Broadcast and reception

Broadcast
As with the sixth season,
the seventh season of Adventure Time featured several "bomb weeks", where new episodes debuted each day. During the first of these, which ran from November 2–6, 2015, the episodes "Bonnie & Neddy" through "Football" aired.
During the second week-long string of episodes, which ran from November 1619, 2015, the eight-episode Stakes story-arc was aired as a miniseries.
The third and final bomb started on January 11, 2016 with "Angel Face" and ended on January 15 with "King's Ransom".

Ratings
The season debuted on November 2, 2015, with the episode "Bonnie & Neddy". This episode was viewed by 1.07 million viewers and scored a 0.3 Nielsen rating in the 18- to 49-year-old demographic—meaning that it was seen by 0.3 percent of all households aged 18–49 who were watching television at the time. This marked a drop from the previous season finale, which was seen by 1.55 million viewers, and it marked a decrease of over two million viewers when compared with the previous season opener. Nevertheless, the miniseries Stakes saw an uptick in viewers, with the first two episodes scoring a 0.4 Nielsen rating in the 18- to 49-year-old demographic and being watched by 1.87 million viewers. During the week that Stakes aired, Adventure Time was able to hold a 0.4 Nielsen rating in the 18- to 49-year-old demographic and attain viewership numbers over 1.7 million for each episode. The season finale, "The Thin Yellow Line", was watched by 1.15 million viewers and scored a 0.28 Nielsen rating in the 18- to 49-year-old demographic, making it the lowest-rated season finale for the show at the time, and making the season as a whole the first in the series to fail to hit the two-million viewer mark for any episode.

Reviews and accolades

The A.V. Club writer Oliver Sava reviewed all of the episodes, grading each with a different letter grade; Stakes was collectively awarded a B, and the rest of the season received two C's, nine B's, and seven A's.

Stakes was met with mostly positive reviews. A wide variety of critics applauded the miniseries for its philosophical musings, with Charlie Jane Anders of io9 arguing that it is a meditation on the concept of change, and Heather Hogan of Autostraddle proposing that the miniseries is a commentary on depression. Many critics also applauded Sugar's song, "Everything Stays". Some critics, however, felt that the miniseries did not live up to expectations.

At the 68th Primetime Emmy Awards in 2016, the episode "The Hall of Egress" was nominated for a Short-format Animation. Herpich and Jason Kolowski each won a Primetime Emmy Award for Outstanding Individual Achievement in Animation, for their work on "Stakes Part 8: The Dark Cloud" and "Bad Jubies", respectively. In late 2016, "Bad Jubies" won an Annie Award for Best Animated Television/Broadcast Production for Children. Kirsten Lepore was nominated for Outstanding Achievement, Directing and Jason Kolowski was nominated for Outstanding Achievement, Production Design for this same episode.

Episodes

Home media

On January 19, 2016, Warner Home Video released Stakes in its entirety on DVD. The DVD release Card Wars (2016) also contains several seventh-season episodes. These DVD release can be purchased on the Cartoon Network Shop, and the individual episodes can be downloaded from both the iTunes Store and Amazon.com.

Full season release
The full season set was released on DVD on July 18, 2017. The seventh season was not released on Blu-ray in Region 1, making it the first Adventure Time season to not receive this treatment.

Notes

References

Adventure Time seasons
2015 American television seasons
2016 American television seasons